Abdurajak Abubakar Janjalani (1959 – December 18, 1998) was the Moro chief founder and leader of the Abu Sayyaf organization until his death in 1998 by Filipino police. Upon his death his brother, Khadaffy Janjalani, took control of the organization.

Janjalani was born on the Philippine island of Basilan to a Tau Sūg father and a Ilonggo Christian mother; his presumed year of birth, 1959, is still subject to dispute. A former teacher, he studied theology and Arabic in Libya, Syria, and Saudi Arabia during the 1980s.

When he returned to the Philippines in 1990 Janjalani was able to attract many Muslim youth to join his organization. Janjalani was also allegedly given $6 million by Osama Bin Laden to establish the organization as an offshoot of the Moro National Liberation Front (MNLF). Janjalani had allegedly met Bin Laden in Afghanistan in the late 1980s and allegedly fought alongside him against the Soviet Union during the Soviet invasion of Afghanistan. At the time of his death, he was the country's most wanted man, with a bounty of 1.5 million pesos on his head.

References

External links
Asia Times: "Philippines the second front in war on terror?"
Looking for al-Qaeda in the Philippines

1959 births
1998 deaths
Tausūg people
Abu Sayyaf members
Deaths by firearm in the Philippines
Filipino Islamists
Filipino Muslims
Leaders of Islamic terror groups
People from Basilan
Salafi jihadists